Daviesia nematophylla is a species of flowering plant in the family Fabaceae and is endemic to the south-west of Western Australia. It is a dense, erect shrub with glabrous foliage, erect, usually needle-shaped phyllodes, and yellow, orange and dark red flowers.

Description

Taxonomy and naming
Daviesia nematophylla was first formally described in 1864 by George Bentham in Flora Australiensis from an unpublished description by Ferdinand von Mueller. The specific epithet (nematophylla) means "thread-like leaved".

Distribution and habitat
This daviesia grows in woodland and heath and is widespread from Coorow to Hopetoun in the Avon Wheatbelt, Coolgardie, Esperance Plains, Jarrah Forest and Mallee biogeographic regions of south-western Western Australia.

Conservation status
Daviesia nematophylla is listed as "not threatened" by the Department of Biodiversity, Conservation and Attractions.

References

nematophylla
Eudicots of Western Australia
Plants described in 1864
Taxa named by George Bentham